Nandyala Varada Rajulu Reddy (born 12 November 1942) is a former MLA of  Proddatur in Kadapa district from Indian National Congress. He won as MLA for Proddatur Assembly Constituency five times in a row from 1985 elections to 2004 elections. In 2009 Assembly elections he was defeated by Mallela Linga Reddy.

Member of Legislative Assembly

References

Living people
Indian National Congress politicians from Andhra Pradesh
Members of the Andhra Pradesh Legislative Assembly
People from Kadapa district
1942 births